The Slave Auction Block in Fredericksburg, Virginia is a large stone that was used as an auction block in historical slave auctions. It was located on the corner of William Street and Charles Street, and is listed on the National Register of Historic Places as part of the Fredericksburg Historic District.

After almost a century of debate as to whether or not it should be removed as a symbol of racial oppression, it was voted by City Council to be moved on June 11, 2019, one year before the protests triggered by the murder of George Floyd. The city council had been planning the block's removal since 2017, with a court victory by the council in February 2020 having cleared the last remaining legal obstacles to moving it. The auction block was removed from its site on June 5, 2020, and is displayed at the Fredericksburg Area Museum.

See also
 List of monuments and memorials removed during the George Floyd protests

References

Fredericksburg, Virginia
Historic district contributing properties in Virginia
National Register of Historic Places in Virginia
History of auctions
Monuments and memorials in Virginia removed during the George Floyd protests
History of slavery in Virginia
Slave trade in the United States